Radium Hill is a former minesite in South Australia which operated from 1906 until 1961. It was Australia's first uranium mine, years before the country's next major mines at Rum Jungle in the Northern Territory (opened in 1950), and the Mary Kathleen mine in Queensland (1958). The associated settlement which once housed up to 1,100 people is now a ghost town, largely abandoned and demolished. The former townsite and cemetery were provisionally listed on the South Australian Heritage Register on 24 August 2016. During its main period of production between 1954 and 1961 the mine produced nearly 1 million tonnes of davidite-bearing ore to produce about 860 tons of U3O8.

History

The site was first pegged for mining in 1906 after prospector Arthur John Smith inadvertently discovered a radioactive material at a location approximately  East South East of Olary. Smith mistook the dark coloured ore he found for tin oxide or wolfram (tungsten). His samples were sent to Adelaide University where young Sydney geologist and future Antarctic explorer, Douglas Mawson found the ore to contain radium and uranium. It also had traces of ilmenite, rutile, magnetite, hematite, pyrite, chalcopyrite intergrown with quartz and biotite, chromium, vanadium, and molybdenum.

Mawson named the uranium-bearing mineral davidite after geologist and Antarctic explorer, Sir Edgeworth David. The mine was initially called "Smith's Carnotite Mine" (a similar uranium-bearing mineral) and in September 1906 Mawson proposed the name "Radium Hill". Smith worked the mine for the next two years before allowing the lease to lapse. Adjoining leases stretched for  along the lode, with one being half-owned by Mawson.

The Radium Hill Company took over the lease in 1908 and more shafts were sunk.

Ore concentrate was transferred to refineries in New South Wales and Victoria. Radium had reached a price of £13,000 per gram in 1911, and in the same year, at a cost of £15,000 the company built a refinery at Hunters Hill in New South Wales to produce radium compounds. 350 milligrams of radium bromide (RaBr2) and 150 kg of uranium were produced. The radium bromide was used for research in the emerging fields of radiation and radioactivity and some of the Hunters Hill radium was sold to pioneering nuclear researchers Ernest Rutherford and Marie Curie.

Mining ceased in 1914 and the Hunters Hill refinery closed the following year.

The mine's second phase of operations started in 1923 when it was operated by the Radium and Rare Earth Treatment Company N.L. which continued operations there until 1931. The company also built a treatment plant in 1923 at Dry Creek near Adelaide to produce radium bromide for medical applications from the Radium Hill ore, however this proved to be uneconomic and both sites had ceased operations by 1932.

Activity recommenced after World War II, with a Department of Mines geological survey in 1944 and exploration and drilling work done in 1946–1947. In March 1952 the Commonwealth and the South Australian governments signed a cost plus uranium supply contract with the UK-USA Combined Development Agency, initially for defence purposes, for delivery over seven years. A section of Maldorkey Station was annexed and proclaimed a "Uranium mining reserve" in 1954 and the mine was officially opened by the Governor General of Australia, Field Marshal Sir William Slim on 10 November the same year.

The state government operated the mine and installed various infrastructure to support the operations. An  spur line connecting the site to the main Broken Hill railway line at Cutana Siding was built in 1954. An aerodrome was constructed and roads improved in the same period. The town to house mine workers and their families was built also. This included 145 houses: in 1961 a population of 867 was recorded. Other town facilities included a hospital, school, government retail store, canteens, swimming pool, a bus service to Broken Hill and recreation and commercial facilities.

Ore was crushed at a ball mill and treated on site at a surface concentrate mill using a heavy media separation and flotation process. It was then rail-freighted to the purpose-built Port Pirie Uranium Treatment Complex which processed ore from Radium Hill and Myponga (Wild Dog Hill), south of Adelaide. The Port Pirie complex was also operated by the state government.

The mine output was 970,000 tonnes of 0.09-0.13% ore and the ore concentrate produced a mix of about 150,000 tonnes of yellowcake which was then processed at Port Pirie where it was subjected to hot acid leaching, producing about 860 tons of U3O8 worth more than £15 million. After seven years of operations, the contract was filled and the plant officially decommissioned on 21 December 1961.

Site rehabilitation

Restoration works on the site were undertaken in 1962 and again in 1981 when the tailings impoundment was covered with about 75,000 m3 of material from four adjacent borrow pits. Backfilling of old mine openings was also undertaken.

Radioactive waste repository

From 1981 an area of the site was gazetted as a low-level radioactive waste repository. Approximately 16 separate consignments of waste, including contaminated soil from Thebarton in the Adelaide metropolitan area was deposited there. The last deposit was made in 1998.

A New South Wales government study in 1979 found the incidence of cancer-related deaths by former Radium Hill workers to be four times the national average. According to the report, 59% of underground miners who had worked there for a period of two years or more had died of cancer.

The site has been inactive since 1998. The Resources Division of Minerals and Energy at the Department of Primary Industry and Resources maintains management responsibility including a radiological watch on the site.

Quotes

See also
Uranium mining in Australia
Ghost Town
Boomtown

Notes

References

Further reading
Mudd, G M, 'The Legacy of Early Uranium Efforts in Australia 1906 to 1945: From Radium Hill to the Atomic Bomb and Today.' Historical Records of Australian Science, 2005, 16 (2) 
Mining in South Australia, 1982, Compiled by J. F. Drexel, Dept. of Mines & Energy South Australia, Special Publication No. 3.
Mudd, G M, Compilation of Uranium Production History and Uranium Deposit Data Across Australia

External links
  Radium Hill Historical Association Retrieved 10 November 2022.

Ghost towns in South Australia
Mining in South Australia
Far North (South Australia)
Uranium mining in South Australia
South Australian Heritage Register
Former mines in Australia